Apio is a surname. Notable people with the surname include:

 Joyce Apio (born 1996), Ugandan cricketer
 Kermet Apio, American stand up comedian

Surnames of Ugandan origin